Hyla lactea is an unaccepted scientific name and may refer to two different species of frogs:
 Rusty tree frog, found in South America and Panama
 Sphaenorhynchus lacteus, found in northern South America and Trinidad